Riverside Township is a township in Burlington County, in the U.S. state of New Jersey. As of the 2020 United States census, the township's population was 8,003, a decrease of 76 (−0.9%) from the 2010 census count of 8,079, which in turn reflected an increase of 168 (+2.1%) from the 7,911 counted in the 2000 census.

Riverside was incorporated as a township by an act of the New Jersey Legislature on February 20, 1895, from portions of Delran Township. A portion of the township was annexed by Delran in 1901. The township was originally named Progress which was changed to Riverside for its location on the Delaware River.

Geography
According to the United States Census Bureau, the township had a total area of 1.61 square miles (4.16 km2), including 1.48 square miles (3.84 km2) of land and 0.12 square miles (0.32 km2) of water (7.70%).

The township borders the Burlington County municipalities of Delanco Township and Delran Township.

Demographics

2010 census

The Census Bureau's 2006–2010 American Community Survey showed that (in 2010 inflation-adjusted dollars) median household income was $56,377 (with a margin of error of +/− $4,391) and the median family income was $65,825 (+/− $9,709). Males had a median income of $46,962 (+/− $4,387) versus $32,413 (+/− $6,739) for females. The per capita income for the borough was $24,243 (+/− $2,264). About 3.9% of families and 8.1% of the population were below the poverty line, including 7.4% of those under age 18 and 2.3% of those age 65 or over.

2000 census
As of the 2000 United States census there were 7,911 people, 2,978 households, and 1,992 families residing in the township. The racial makeup of the township was 90.22% White, 4.44% African American, 0.14% Native American, 0.42% Asian, 0.01% Pacific Islander, 2.28% from other races, and 2.50% from two or more races. Hispanic or Latino of any race were 4.11% of the population.

There were 2,978 households, out of which 32.8% had children under the age of 18 living with them, 48.4% were married couples living together, 12.0% had a female householder with no husband present, and 33.1% were non-families. 27.3% of all households were made up of individuals, and 11.5% had someone living alone who was 65 years of age or older. The average household size was 2.64 and the average family size was 3.21.

In the township the population was spread out, with 25.0% under the age of 18, 8.4% from 18 to 24, 33.4% from 25 to 44, 19.4% from 45 to 64, and 13.8% who were 65 years of age or older. The median age was 36 years. For every 100 females, there were 99.0 males.  For every 100 females age 18 and over, there were 98.2 males.

The median income for a household in the township was $43,358, and the median income for a family was $52,479. Males had a median income of $36,556 versus $25,510 for females. The per capita income for the township was $18,758. About 6.7% of families and 8.2% of the population were below the poverty line, including 7.4% of those under age 18 and 8.0% of those age 65 or over.

Government

Local government 
Riverside Township is governed under the Township form of New Jersey municipal government, one of 141 municipalities (of the 564) statewide that use this form, the second-most commonly used form of government in the state. The Township Committee is comprised of five members, who are elected directly by the voters at-large in partisan elections to serve three-year terms of office on a staggered basis, with either one or two seats coming up for election each year as part of the November general election in a three-year cycle. At an annual reorganization meeting, the Township Committee selects one of its members to serve as Mayor and another as Deputy Mayor, each for a term of one year.

, members of the Riverside Township Committee are Mayor Jason M. Frey (D, term on committee ends December 31, 2021; term as mayor ends 2020), Deputy Mayor Corey S. Kimble (D, term on committee ends December 31, 2023; term as mayor ends 2022), Deputy Mayor J. Michael Higgins (D, term on committee ends 2023; term as deputy mayor ends 2022), Robert Giovanetti (D, 2024), Matthew Kirk (R, 2024) and Michelle M. Weaver (D, 2022).

In March 2019, the Township Committee chose Michael Higgins from a list of three candidates nominated by the Democratic municipal committee to fill the seat expiring in December 2020 that became vacant when Michael D. Miller submitted his resignation. In the November 2019 general election, Republican Matthew Kirk defeated Higgins by a single vote and was elected to serve the balance of the term of office.

In January 2018, Republican F. Michael Hart was selected by the Township Committee from a list of three candidates nominated by the Republican municipal committee to fill the seat expiring in December 2019 that was vacated by Robert R. Prisco after he resigned to accept a Judicial appointment to a New Jersey Workers' Compensation Judgeship; Hart served on an interim basis until the November 2018 general election, when voters elected Democrat Michelle Weaver to serve the balance of the term of office.

In July 2016, Jason Frey was selected by the Township Committee to fill the seat expiring in December 2018 that was vacated by Timothy LeConey when he announced that he was resigning and moving out of the township. Frey served on an interim basis until the November 2016 general election, when he was elected to serve the balance of the term of office.

On Election Day, November 7, 2006, Mayor Chuck Hilton and fellow Republican incumbent James Ott were defeated by their Democratic opponents, newcomers Lorraine Hatcher and Thomas Polino. An anti-immigration ordinance passed by the Township Committee that imposed fines on any business that hires or any landlord who rents to an illegal immigrant was a major issue in the campaign.

Federal, state and county representation 
Riverside is located in the 3rd Congressional District and is part of New Jersey's 7th state legislative district.

 

Burlington County is governed by a Board of County Commissioners comprised of five members who are chosen at-large in partisan elections to serve three-year terms of office on a staggered basis, with either one or two seats coming up for election each year; at an annual reorganization meeting, the board selects a director and deputy director from among its members to serve a one-year term. , Burlington County's Commissioners are
Director Felicia Hopson (D, Willingboro Township, term as commissioner ends December 31, 2024; term as director ends 2023),
Deputy Director Tom Pullion (D, Edgewater Park, term as commissioner and as deputy director ends 2023),
Allison Eckel (D, Medford, 2025),
Daniel J. O'Connell (D, Delran Township, 2024) and 
Balvir Singh (D, Burlington Township, 2023). 
Burlington County's Constitutional Officers are
County Clerk Joanne Schwartz (R, Southampton Township, 2023)
Sheriff James H. Kostoplis (D, Bordentown, 2025) and 
Surrogate Brian J. Carlin (D, Burlington Township, 2026).

Politics
As of March 2011, there were a total of 4,189 registered voters in Riverside Township, of which 1,527 (36.5% vs. 33.3% countywide) were registered as Democrats, 685 (16.4% vs. 23.9%) were registered as Republicans and 1,974 (47.1% vs. 42.8%) were registered as Unaffiliated. There were 3 voters registered as Libertarians or Greens. Among the township's 2010 Census population, 51.9% (vs. 61.7% in Burlington County) were registered to vote, including 67.4% of those ages 18 and over (vs. 80.3% countywide).

In the 2012 presidential election, Democrat Barack Obama received 1,816 votes here (61.7% vs. 58.1% countywide), ahead of Republican Mitt Romney with 1,073 votes (36.5% vs. 40.2%) and other candidates with 31 votes (1.1% vs. 1.0%), among the 2,941 ballots cast by the township's 4,329 registered voters, for a turnout of 67.9% (vs. 74.5% in Burlington County). In the 2008 presidential election, Democrat Barack Obama received 1,881 votes here (58.9% vs. 58.4% countywide), ahead of Republican John McCain with 1,233 votes (38.6% vs. 39.9%) and other candidates with 42 votes (1.3% vs. 1.0%), among the 3,191 ballots cast by the township's 4,278 registered voters, for a turnout of 74.6% (vs. 80.0% in Burlington County). In the 2004 presidential election, Democrat John Kerry received 1,726 votes here (56.7% vs. 52.9% countywide), ahead of Republican George W. Bush with 1,278 votes (42.0% vs. 46.0%) and other candidates with 24 votes (0.8% vs. 0.8%), among the 3,044 ballots cast by the township's 4,197 registered voters, for a turnout of 72.5% (vs. 78.8% in the whole county).

In the 2013 gubernatorial election, Republican Chris Christie received 1,018 votes here (59.4% vs. 61.4% countywide), ahead of Democrat Barbara Buono with 634 votes (37.0% vs. 35.8%) and other candidates with 18 votes (1.1% vs. 1.2%), among the 1,714 ballots cast by the township's 4,254 registered voters, yielding a 40.3% turnout (vs. 44.5% in the county). In the 2009 gubernatorial election, Democrat Jon Corzine received 854 ballots cast (46.4% vs. 44.5% countywide), ahead of Republican Chris Christie with 821 votes (44.6% vs. 47.7%), Independent Chris Daggett with 104 votes (5.7% vs. 4.8%) and other candidates with 28 votes (1.5% vs. 1.2%), among the 1,840 ballots cast by the township's 4,324 registered voters, yielding a 42.6% turnout (vs. 44.9% in the county).

Education
The Riverside School District serves public school students in pre-kindergarten through twelfth grade. As of the 2019–20 school year, the district, comprised of three schools, had an enrollment of 1,470 students and 108.4 classroom teachers (on an FTE basis), for a student–teacher ratio of 13.6:1. Schools in the district (with 2019–20 enrollment data from the National Center for Education Statistics) are 
Riverside Township Elementary School with 708 students in grades Pre-K–5, 
Riverside Township Middle School with 292 students in grades 6–8 and 
Riverside Township High School with 423 students in grades 9–12.

Students from Delanco Township attend Riverside High School as part of a sending/receiving relationship with the Delanco Township School District.

Students from Riverside Township, and from all of Burlington County, are eligible to attend the Burlington County Institute of Technology, a countywide public school district that serves the vocational and technical education needs of students at the high school and post-secondary level at its campuses in Medford and Westampton.

Transportation

Roads and highways

No Interstate, U.S. or state highways directly serve Riverside Township. The most significant road passing through the township is County Route 543.

Public transportation
The Riverside station, located on Zubrugg Way (formerly Franklin Street), provides service on the River Line light rail system, offering southbound service to Camden and the Walter Rand Transportation Center with connections to PATCO Speedline trains to Philadelphia and the Camden County suburbs and northbound service to the Trenton Rail Station with connections to NJ Transit trains to New York City, SEPTA trains to Philadelphia and Amtrak trains.

NJ Transit provides bus service in the borough on the 419 route that runs between Camden and Burlington.

In film
Riverside was used for the filming of the film Jesus' Son and was the site of picketing by nuns who objected to the implication from the film's title that Jesus fathered a child.

Immigration debate
In July 2006, a controversial ordinance was passed by the township committee trying to handle the large number of unauthorized immigrants, primarily  from Brazil, that had moved into the township. The ordinance stated that employers who hired an illegal immigrant and landlords who rented to them would be fined $1,000 - $2,000 per incident and could possibly lose their business license. In response to the ordinance, several civil groups including the ACLU and People for the American Way took or contemplated legal actions against the ordinance.

In August 2007, the ordinance was repealed, and some have speculated that the exodus of over 1,000 immigrants from Riverside to other New Jersey townships was a major factor.  The ordinance repealing the law cited the high cost of defending it against further legal challenges.

Notable people

Many people born in Riverside Township were born at Zurbrugg Hospital during a period of about 75 years beginning in 1915. People who were born in, residents of, or otherwise closely associated with Riverside Township include:
 Jim Bailey (1938–2015), singer, film, television and stage actor, and female impersonator
 Deron Cherry (born 1959), played for the NFL Kansas City Chiefs from 1981 to 1991, and was a six-time Pro Bowler at safety
 Lesley Choyce (born 1951), author
 Bill Duff (born 1974), former professional football player who has been host of Human Weapon on the History Channel
 John W. Dutko (1916–1944), recipient of the Medal of Honor for his actions against German troops in Italy during World War II
 Benjamin Faunce (1873–1949), American druggist and businessman
 Kenneth William Faulkner (born 1947), former member of the New Jersey General Assembly, who was a teacher, school administrator and basketball coach at Burlington Township High School
 Michael Giacchino (born 1967), music composer, notably for the TV series Lost and Pixar's The Incredibles, Ratatouille, and Up
 Derek Holloway (born 1961), retired football player, who was a wide receiver in the NFL for the Washington Redskins and the Tampa Bay Buccaneers
 Adam Hughes (born 1967), comic book artist
 George Lehmann (born 1942), former professional basketball player who played in the NBA and ABA
 Todd Lehmann, former basketball player (and son of George Lehmann), who played for Drexel University where he led the nation with 9.29 assists per game in his senior year
 Pierre Leon (1838–1915), Medal of Honor recipient for his actions during the Civil War
 A. Raymond Randolph (born 1943), judge on the United States Court of Appeals for the District of Columbia Circuit

References

External links

Township website
Riverside School District

Data for the Riverside School District, National Center for Education Statistics

 
1895 establishments in New Jersey
Populated places established in 1895
Township form of New Jersey government
Townships in Burlington County, New Jersey
New Jersey populated places on the Delaware River